An indirect election for the position of President of the Hellenic Republic was held by the Hellenic Parliament on 8 February 2005.

Running unopposed,  veteran PASOK politician and former Foreign Minister of Greece Karolos Papoulias was elected on the first ballot with the record number of 279 votes, with 163 MPs of the ruling New Democracy party, 114 MPs of PASOK and two independent MPs voting in support, four MPs absent, while the 17 MPs of Synaspismos and the Communist Party of Greece voted "present". He was sworn in on 12 March 2005, succeeding Konstantinos Stephanopoulos.

References

2005
Presidential election
Greek presidential election